{{Infobox television
| image                =
| alt_name             = 
| genre                = Soap opera
| creator              = K. K. Sudhakaran
| based_on             = Punarjanmam
| writer               = Dinesh Pallathu
| screenplay           = 
| creative_director    = Baiju Deveraj
| director             = Sudheesh Sankar
| starring             = 
| country              = India
| language             = Malayalam
| num_seasons          = 1
| num_episodes         = 733
| list_episodes        = 
| producer             = Baiju Deveraj
| company              = Sandras Communication
| theme_music_composer = Sanjeev Lal
| opentheme            = "Akale Pokayo" sung by Sayanora Philip
| endtheme             = "Onnamkili sung by Manjari
| cinematography       = Anpu Mani
| editor               = Baiju Deveraj
| camera               = Multi-camera
| runtime              = approx. 20-22 minutes per episode
| channel              = Asianet
| first_aired          = 
| last_aired           =  
}}Ente Manasaputhri'' ( "The daughter of my mind")  was  a 2007 Malayalam Television soap opera telecasted on Asianet TV channel from Monday to Friday at 7:00PM IST. It was sequel of Punarjanmam which aired on Surya TV and they telecasted only 95 episodes.  It is remarked as one of the top rated TV series in Malayalam with a stellar star cast.

Plot

The story revolves around two orphans, Sofia and Gloria with a very difference in nature and temperaments. Sofia (played by Sreekala) is a very calm and simple, whereas Gloria (played by Archana) is ambitious and extrovert. The story was mainly about the life and rivalry of Sofia and Gloria and also on human relationships, misunderstandings, love, jealousy, greed, and sacrifice.

Cast
Lead Cast
Sreekala Sasidharan as Sofiya
Archana Suseelan as Gloriya
Sona Nair as Sandhya Menon
Beena Antony as Yamuna
Sreenath as Devan
Rajeev Parameshwar as Prakash
Other Cast
Jayan Cherthala as Thobiyas
Fazal Razi as Adarsh Menon
Souparnika Subash as Deepa
Bindu Murali as Sarojini
Namitha Pramod as Anjali
Venu Nagavally as Chandrasekhar
Shiju as Arjun
Prem Kumar as Anirudhan
Shammi Thilakan as Ananthagopan
Karthika Kannan as Mumtaz
Arya as Kareena
Rajasenan as Rajasenan
Vijayakumari 
Kottayam Rasheed as CI
Vijay Menon as DYSP
Balaji Sharma as Bakker Pookottil
Murugan as Murugan
Kollam Thulasi as Balabhadran
V K Baiju as Krishnamoorthy
Adam Ayoob as DIG
G.K.Pillai as Narayanan
Sreekala as Ammini
Kulappulli Leela as Ponnammma
Kallayam Krishnadas as Ayyappan
Dileep Shankar as Benjamin
Murali Mohan as Shiva Subramaniam
G.K.Pillai as Warrier 
Hima Shankar as Jennifer 
Sarath Das
T. P. Madhavan
Thesni Khan
Dinesh Panicker
Baby Malavika
P. Sreekumar
Suma Jayaram
Kalabhavan Prajod

Adaptations

References

2007 Indian television series debuts
2010 Indian television series endings
Malayalam-language television shows
Asianet (TV channel) original programming